Hector Alexander McKay (15 December 1904 – 15 March 1969) was an Australian rules footballer who played with South Melbourne in the VFL.

A defender, McKay debuted for South Melbourne in 1926 and won their Best and Fairest the following season. He played at fullback in the club's 1933 Grand Final win.

References

External links

 

1904 births
1969 deaths
Sydney Swans players
Sydney Swans Premiership players
Bob Skilton Medal winners
Australian rules footballers from Victoria (Australia)
One-time VFL/AFL Premiership players